KJRV (93.3 FM, "Big Jim 93.3") is a radio station licensed to serve Wessington Springs, South Dakota serving the Huron-Mitchell area.  The station is owned by Dakota Communications. It airs a Classic rock music format.

The station was assigned the KJRV call letters by the Federal Communications Commission on June 22, 2005.

References

External links
 Station Website

JRV
Mass media in the Mitchell, South Dakota micropolitan area
Jerauld County, South Dakota
Classic rock radio stations in the United States